The following are notable people who were either born, raised or have lived for a significant period of time in the city of Helsinki, Finland.

Academics and scientists 
 Lars Ahlfors (1907–1996), mathematician, Fields Medalist
 Kai Donner (1888–1935), linguist, anthropologist & politician
 Peter Forsskål (1732–1763), Swedish-Finnish naturalist & orientalist
 Ragnar Granit (1900–1991), Finnish-Swedish neurophysiologist, Nobel laureate in Physiology or Medicine (1967)
 Elina Haavio-Mannila (born 1933), social scientist & professor
 Bengt Holmström (born 1949), Professor of Economics at MIT, Nobel laureate in Economics (2016)
 Olli Lehto (born 1925), mathematician
 Rolf Nevanlinna (1895–1980), mathematician, university teacher & writer
 Gunnar Nordström (1881–1923), theoretical physicist
 Jakob Sederholm (1863–1934), petrologist
 Artturi Ilmari Virtanen (1895–1973), chemist, Nobel laureate in Chemistry (1945)
 Marianne Kärrholm (1921–2018), Swedish chemical engineer and professor
 Ulla Vuorela (1945–2011), professor of social anthropology

Artists and designers

Architects 
 Axel Hampus Dalström (1829–1882), architect
 Carl Ludvig Engel (1778–1840), German architect
 Juha Leiviskä (born 1936), architect

Fiber art, textile design 
 Kirsti Ilvessalo (1920–2019), textile artist

Entrepreneurs 
 Karl Fazer (1866–1932), baker, confectioner, chocolatier, entrepreneur, & sport shooter
 Peter Nygård (born 1941), Finnish-Canadian businessman, arrested in December 2020 for sex crimes
 Armi Ratia (1912–1979), textile designer & co-founder of Marimekko
 Linus Torvalds (born 1969), software engineer, creator of Linux

Clergy 
 Lennart Koskinen (born 1944), Evangelical Lutheran Bishop of Visby (2003–2011)
 Samuel Lehtonen (1921–2010), Evangelical Lutheran Bishop of Helsinki (1982–1991)

Filmmakers 
 Aki Kaurismäki (born 1957), film director, screenwriter & producer
 Erkki Karu (1887–1935), film director & producer
 Gustaf Molander (1888–1973), Swedish director & screenwriter
 Diana Ringo (born 1992), film director & composer
 Mauritz Stiller (1883–1928), Russian-Swedish director & screenwriter

Musicians 
 Paavo Berglund (1929–2012), conductor
 Laci Boldemann (1921–1969), composer
 Reino Helismaa (1913–1965), writer, film actor & singer
 Tuomas Holopainen (born 1976), songwriter, multi-instrumentalist & record producer
 Lill Lindfors (born 1940), Finnish-Swedish singer & television presenter
 Magnus Lindberg (born 1958), composer & pianist
 Georg Malmstén (1902–1981), singer, musician, composer, orchestra director & actor
 Tauno Marttinen (1912–2008), composer
 Oskar Merikanto (1868–1924), composer
 Jari Mäenpää (born 1977), founder, former lead guitarist & current lead singer in melodic death metal band Wintersun, former lead singer & guitarist of folk metal band Ensiferum
 Klaus Mäkelä (born 1996), cellist & conductor
 Susanna Mälkki (born 1969), conductor
 Sakari Oramo (born 1965), principal conductor of BBC Symphony Orchestra
 Einojuhani Rautavaara (1928–2016), composer
 Kaija Saariaho (born 1952), composer
 Esa-Pekka Salonen (born 1958), composer, principal conductor of Philharmonia Orchestra (2008–2021)
 Heikki Sarmanto (born 1939), jazz pianist & composer
 Agnes Tschetschulin (1859–1942), composer & violinist
 Ville Valo (born 1976), lead singer of the rock band HIM
 Lauri Ylönen (born 1979), lead singer of the rock band The Rasmus

Entertainment 
 George Gaynes (1917–2016), American actor & singer
 Maggie Gripenberg (1881–1976), dancer
 Ella Eronen (1900-1987), actor
 Vesa-Matti Loiri (born 1945), actor, comedian, singer
 Markku Peltola (1956–2007), actor & musician
 Anne Pohtamo (born 1955), beauty queen, Miss Suomi 1975, Miss Universe 1975
 Asko Sarkola (born 1945), actor

Political and military figures 
 Tarja Cronberg (born 1943), politician
 Tarja Halonen (born 1943), President of Finland (2000–2012)
 Johan Helo (1889–1966), lawyer & politician
 Abdirahim Hussein Mohamed (born 1978), Finnish-Somalian media personality & politician
 Yrjö Leino (1897–1961), communist politician, Minister of the Interior (1946–1948)
 Carl Gustaf Emil Mannerheim (1867–1951), statesman and Marshal of Finland
 Elisabeth Rehn (born 1935), Minister of Defence (1990–1995)
 Alexander Stubb (born 1968), Prime Minister of Finland (2014–2015)
 Väinö Tanner (1881–1966), Prime Minister of Finland (1926–1927)
 Toivo Wiherheimo (1898–1970), economist & politician
 Karl Wiik (1883–1946), Social Democratic politician

Sports people 
 Kim Hirschovits (born 1982), ice hockey player
 Shawn Huff, Finnish basketball player
 Walter Jakobsson (1882–1957), figure-skater
 Petteri Koponen, Finnish basketball player
 Emil Lindh (1867–1937), sailor
 Lennart Lindroos (1886–?), swimmer, Olympic games 1912
 Hanno Möttölä Finnish basketball player
 Miron Ruina (born 1998), Finnish-Israeli basketball player
 Riitta Salin (born 1950), athlete
 Sasu Salin (born 1991), Finnish basketball player
 Teemu Selänne (born 1970), Hall of Fame ice hockey player

Writers 
 Helena Anhava (1925-2018), poet, author & translator
 Irja Agnes Browallius (1901–1968), Swedish writer
 Bo Carpelan (1926–2011), Finnish-Swedish writer, literary critic & translator
 Elmer Diktonius (1896–1961), Finnish-Swedish writer & composer
 Tove Jansson (1914–2001), Finnish-Swedish writer, painter, cartoonist, author of “Moomins”
 Märta Tikkanen (born 1935), Finnish-Swedish writer
 Sirkka Turkka (born 1939), poet
 Mika Waltari (1908–1979), writer

Others 
 Minna Craucher (1891–1932), socialite & spy
 Elin Törnudd (1924– 2008), Finnish chief librarian & professor

Helsinki